Miragoâne is a coastal commune in western Haiti and the capital of the Nippes department. It is also the headquarters of the Miragoâne Arrondissement. It is regarded as one of the major ports in the trade in used goods.  Bales of used clothing, shoes, appliances and used cars arrive at the port from Miami and other U.S. cities. Local merchants in the informal sector buy boxes and bales of used goods to sort and resell them in street markets. Inexpensive merchandise is thus dispersed around Haiti.

The port was used by Reynolds Metals aluminum for export of bauxite which was mined inland between the 1960s and 1980s. It is now the site of a collaboration between Max Hardberger and the Bigio family's GB Group for further port development.

Education
Lycée Jacques Prevert high school

Notes

 
Populated coastal places in Haiti
Nippes
Gulf of Gonâve
Communes of Haiti